Anthocyanone A is a degradation product of malvidin 3-O-glucoside under acidic conditions. It is found in wine.

References 

Cyclohexadienes
Wine chemistry
Enols